Ahitsa  (also Ahitsõ) is an unpopulated village in Rõuge Parish, Võru County in southeastern Estonia. The population has been 0 since 2011.

References

Villages in Võru County
Ghost towns in Estonia